Laramie is a former station on the Chicago Transit Authority's "L" system on the Douglas Branch while it was a branch of the Blue Line. The station closed on February 9, 1992, because of service cuts that resulted from budget problems. It was temporarily put back into service on February 25, 2002, for the Douglas Rehabilitation Project while the terminal at 54th/Cermak was being rebuilt. It was again closed before the new station at 54th/Cermak opened on August 16, 2003. However, the station was never demolished because it was considered historic.

References

External links
Abandoned Laramie Avenue Station from Google Maps Street View

CTA Blue Line stations
Railway stations in the United States opened in 1910
Railway stations closed in 1992
Railway stations in the United States opened in 2002
Railway stations closed in 2003
Defunct Chicago "L" stations
Cicero, Illinois
1910 establishments in Illinois
2003 disestablishments in Illinois